Fluanisone is a typical antipsychotic and sedative of the butyrophenone chemical class. It is used in the treatment of schizophrenia and mania. It is also a component (along with fentanyl) of the injectable veterinary formulation fentanyl/fluanisone (Hypnorm) where it is used for rodent analgesia during short surgical procedures.

See also
 Enciprazine
 BMY-14802
 Azaperone

References 

Butyrophenone antipsychotics
Fluoroarenes
Phenol ethers
Piperazines
Phenylpiperazines
Typical antipsychotics